3-hydroxyanthranilate 3,4-dioxygenase is an enzyme encoded by the HAAO gene that catalyzes the chemical reaction

3-hydroxyanthranilate + O2  2-amino-3-carboxymuconate semialdehyde

Thus, the two substrates of this enzyme are 3-hydroxyanthranilate and O2, whereas its product is 2-amino-3-carboxymuconate semialdehyde.

This enzyme belongs to the family of oxidoreductases, specifically those acting on single donors with O2 as oxidant and incorporation of two atoms of oxygen into the substrate (oxygenases). The oxygen incorporated need not be derived from O2.

The systematic name of this enzyme class is 3-hydroxyanthranilate:oxygen 3,4-oxidoreductase (decyclizing). Other names in common use include 3-hydroxyanthranilate oxygenase, 3-hydroxyanthranilic acid oxygenase, 3-hydroxyanthranilic oxygenase, 3-hydroxyanthranilic acid oxidase and 3HAO. This enzyme participates in tryptophan metabolism. It employs one cofactor, iron.

Structural studies

References

 
 Boyer, P.D., Lardy, H. and Myrback, K. (Eds.), The Enzymes, 2nd ed., vol. 8, Academic Press, New York, 1963, p. 353-371.

EC 1.13.11
Iron enzymes
Enzymes of known structure